Perunguzhi is a village in Chirayinkeezh Taluk, Thiruvananthapuram District, Kerala. It is under the jurisdiction of Azhoor Panchayat. There are many temples and backwaters. It is situated 19km south of Varkala and 22km north of Trivandrum City.

Transportation
Perunguzhi lies on the Thiruvananthapuram-Kollam railway route; only passenger trains halt here. There are buses to East Fort. Boat service in Kadinamkulam lake connects Perunguzhi and Perumathura.

Temples
The biggest temple in Perunguzhi is Sree Rajarajaswari temple, which is believed to be over 1000 years old

Economy
Coir industry is one of the major businesses in Perunguzhy.Gulf money is the source of people's income.

Education
Govt. L.P. and V.P.U.P and Govt High school are located in the Panchayat of Azhoor.

Tourism
The Agni Kavadi festival at the Rajarajeswari Temple at Perunguzhi draws many devotees. Sarkara Devi Temple, Chirayinkeezh is nearby. "Kadinamkulam Kayal" attracts many tourists.

References

External links
 About Perunguzhi
 Rajarajeswari Temple
 www.tvmcity.com on perunguzhi
 lsgkerala.in on Azhoorpanchayat

Villages in Thiruvananthapuram district